Remalda Kergytė (born 25 August 1985) is a Lithuanian marathon and half marathon runner. Her marathon personal record is 2:38:48 set at 2008 in Dresden.

She represented Lithuania in 2009 World Championships in Athletics, reaching 52nd place.  At the 2013 World Championships, she improved to 30th place.

Achievements

References

1985 births
Living people
Lithuanian female long-distance runners
Sportspeople from Šiauliai
Athletes (track and field) at the 2012 Summer Olympics
Olympic athletes of Lithuania
Lithuanian female marathon runners
Competitors at the 2009 Summer Universiade